Brad Jenkins may refer to:
Brad Jenkins (American football) (born c. 1954), American football player and coach
Brad Jenkins (producer), American producer
Brad Jenkins, character in Almost Normal